{{DISPLAYTITLE:C20H28I3N3O9}}
The molecular formula C20H28I3N3O9 (molar mass: 835.164 g/mol) may refer to:

 Iobitridol
 Iopentol

Molecular formulas